Albert Paul Michaels (November 14, 1911 – October 17, 1991) was an American football player, coach, and college athletics administrator. As defensive coordinator for North Carolina State University under Earle Edwards from 1954 to 1970, he has long been considered one of the games most influential defensive minds with his famous "white shoes defense". He acted as interim head football coach for the 1971 team, hiring protégé Chuck Amato to his first full-time assistant job during his tenure as head coach.

A native of DuBois, Pennsylvania, Michaels played college football at Pennsylvania State University and coached there for 19 years before moving on to NC State. He also coached golfat NC State. Michael died on October 17, 1991, in Raleigh, North Carolina, following a long illness.

Head coaching record

References

External links
 

1911 births
1991 deaths
American football quarterbacks
NC State Wolfpack athletic directors
NC State Wolfpack football coaches
Penn State Nittany Lions football coaches
Penn State Nittany Lions football players
College golf coaches in the United States
People from DuBois, Pennsylvania
Coaches of American football from Pennsylvania
Players of American football from Pennsylvania